Indiana University–Purdue University Indianapolis, commonly referred to as IUPUI, is a public research university in Indianapolis, Indiana. It is a collaboration between Indiana University and Purdue University that offers undergraduate, graduate, and professional degrees from both universities. Administered primarily through Indiana University as a core campus and secondarily through Purdue University as a regional campus, it is Indiana's primary urban research and academic health sciences institution. IUPUI is located in downtown Indianapolis along the White River and Fall Creek.

Among more than 550 degree programs, the urban university hosts the primary campuses for both the Indiana University School of Medicine, with more than 2,000 students, and the Indiana University School of Dentistry, the only dental school in the state. Also the Indiana University Robert H. McKinney School of Law is one of the two Indiana University law schools. After excluding the research budget of the IU School of Medicine, IUPUI is classified among "R2: Doctoral Universities – High research activity."

The IUPUI Jaguars compete in the NCAA's Division I in the Horizon League. Several athletics venues are located on the campus, including the IU Michael A. Carroll Track & Soccer Stadium and Indiana University Natatorium, the largest indoor pool in the United States with a seating capacity of 4,700.

On August 12, 2022, the boards of trustees of both Purdue and IU announced that IUPUI will split into two separate universities, with completion of the split to be finished by the fall 2024 semester.

History
Founded in 1969, IUPUI is an urban campus in Indianapolis, the 15th largest city in the United States, with a population of two million in the metropolitan statistical area. The campus is just west of downtown, within walking distance of the state capitol and other governmental offices, and the site of numerous nationally renowned businesses and art, sports, education, and health facilities.

In 1968, Dr. Maynard K. Hine, dean of the IU School of Dentistry began working with then-Mayor of Indianapolis Richard Lugar, IU President Joseph L. Sutton, Purdue President Frederick L. Hovde, and others to establish IUPUI in 1969 through the merger of the Indianapolis extension programs of both IU and Purdue. Some schools, however, were established before the merger, including the IU School of Medicine, IU School of Dentistry, IU Robert H. McKinney School of Law, IU School of Liberal Arts, and IU Herron School of Art.

The student-run newspaper of the former IU extension campus, the Onomatopoeia, and that of the former Purdue University extension campus, the Component, merged in 1971 to form The Sagamore, which operated until 2009. Archives are available online. That publication was replaced by The Campus Citizen in 2011.

IUPUI includes the nation's largest nursing school, the main campus of the largest medical school in the country, the only dental school in the state, and the country's oldest school of physical education. IUPUI is among the top 20 campuses in the nation for graduate professional degrees conferred.

As a core campus of Indiana University, IUPUI is primarily governed by the IU Board of Trustees. Purdue University degree-granting programs are governed by the Purdue University Board of Trustees. While integrated into the Indiana University system budget, IUPUI is semi-autonomous in that it retains some independent control of its own academic curricula.

On August 12, 2022, the boards of trustees of both Purdue and IU announced that IUPUI would split into two separate universities, with completion of the split set to be finished by the fall 2024 semester. The School of Science will be operated by IU along with its other programs, including business, law, nursing, and social work, with the exception of the computer science department. The computer science, engineering, and technology programs will be operated by Purdue as a fully integrated extension of its West Lafayette campus. IU will add new computer science programs to its School of Informatics, Computing and Engineering, and Purdue intends to open a branch of its applied research institute on or near the IUPUI campus. IU will provide certain administrative services to both academic organizations and for the athletic programs.

Academics

IUPUI is one of nine campuses of the Indiana University and one of five campuses of the Purdue University system. The campus offers more than 550 degree programs provided by 17 different schools, two of which are Purdue University schools.

IUPUI has more students from the state of Indiana than any other campus in the state, the largest number of underrepresented minorities in the Indiana University system, and the largest population of graduate and professional students of any university in Indiana. Almost 75 percent of IUPUI classes have 25 or fewer students.

IUPUI has more than 3,800 full-time faculty members. With research funding of more than $535 million, IUPUI is the second-largest site for research in Indiana.

Indiana University programs 

 Herron School of Art and Design
 Departments of: 
 Kelley School of Business
 School of Dentistry
 Departments of: 
 School of Education
 Departments of: Elementary Education (includes Physical Education and Music Education) • Secondary Education (includes Natural Sciences, Mathematical Sciences, Social Sciences, Language Arts, Foreign Languages)
 IU Fairbanks School of Public Health
 IU School of Health and Rehabilitation Sciences
 Departments of: 

 IU School of Informatics and Computing
 Departments of: Human-Centered Computing, BioHealth Informatics, and Library and Information Science.
 IU Robert H. McKinney School of Law
 IU School of Liberal Arts
 Departments of: 
 IU School of Medicine
 Departments of: 
 IU School of Nursing
 IU School of Physical Education and Tourism Management
 Departments of: 
 O'Neill School of Public and Environmental Affairs
 Departments of: 
 IU School of Social Work
 offering a BSW, MSW, and PhD program. MSW concentrations include: school social work; child welfare; leadership; mental health and addictions; children and families; and healthcare social work.
 IU Lilly Family School of Philanthropy
 Offering a BA, MA, PhD and PhilD program.  
 Houses the Lake Family Institute on Faith and Giving, the Women's Philanthropy Institute, and the Mays Family Institute on Diverse Philanthropy

Purdue University programs 
 Purdue School of Engineering and Technology
 
 
 Purdue School of Science
 Departments of:

Rankings

 The U.S. News & World Report 2022 edition of "Best Colleges" ranked the university tied for 196th among national universities and tied for 99th among public universities, tied for 46th in the "Most Innovative Schools" category, 67th in "Best Value Schools", and tied for 114th in "Best Undergraduate Engineering Programs" 
 The 2022 Niche College Rankings ranked the university 187th among public universities in America.
 The Washington Monthly 2021 edition of "National University Rankings" ranked the university tied for 190th among national universities.
 The 2021 Academic Ranking of World Universities (ARWU) ranked the university 301st-400th internationally and 90th-110th nationally.
 The 2021 Center for World University Rankings (CWUR) ranked the university 387th internationally and 114th nationally.

Accreditation
IUPUI has been accredited by the Higher Learning Commission since 1972. Many individual programs at IUPUI are accredited by discipline-specific accreditors.

Research
IUPUI's strategic research initiatives include:
 Signature Center Initiative
 Translating Research into Practice (TRIP)
 IUPUI Arts and Humanities Institute
 IUPUI Imaging Research Institute
 STEM Education Research Institute
 The Transportation & Autonomous Systems Institute (TASI)
 Integrated Nanosystems Development Institute
 Indiana Clinical and Translational Sciences Institute
 Indiana Physician Scientist Initiative
 Innovation-to-Enterprise Central
 Ideas Solving Social and Economic Challenges Student Competition
 IUPUI Nanotechnology Discovery Academy

IUPUI's research expenditures for fiscal year 2014 totaled $271,093,483 with the federal government as the largest sponsor of the research at 61 percent of the total.

Research labs 

IUPUI CyberLab is a research and development lab in the School of Engineering and Technology. The lab provides research and intellectual support for the design, development, and implementation of innovative educational technology. The CyberLab was established in 1996 by Dr. Ali Jafari and funded by William Plater, the Executive Vice-Chancellor of IUPUI at the time. Ali Jafari, David Mills, Brian Ho, and Amy Warner was the first team at the CyberLab to start working on the development of the very first online (based on the Internet) on an Indiana University campus. The team received $160,000 from Indiana University to continue to implement Oncourse for all courses at IUPUI. Starting in 1998, Indiana University - Purdue University was the first IU campus to put all courses online. The CyberLab continued to develop and has now launched several projects, including; Sakai, ANGEL Learning, Epsilen, and the current project called CourseNetworking.

Campus
{
  "type": "ExternalData",
  "service": "geoshape",
  "ids": "Q1433199",
  "properties": {
    "title": "IUPUI",
    "description": "",
    "stroke": "#125123",
    "stroke-width": 3,
    "fill": "#2aaf4d"
  }
}

The entire campus is located in the 46202 zip code.

The campus offers several new buildings including:
 University Hall (opened July 2015) – University Hall is the home of the IU Lilly Family School of Philanthropy and also offers additional space for the IU School of Social Work. It also serves as the home to IUPUI administration, the IUPUI Office of Alumni Relations and IU Foundation.
 Engineering Science & Technology Building – The first nonmedical science building to open on the IUPUI campus in 20 years contains more than 35,000 assignable square feet for research and teaching spaces. The first phase will include space for biomedical engineering, psychobiology, renewable energy research programs, and biology and chemistry labs. The second phase will provide space for teaching labs, meeting rooms, additional expansions, additional research laboratories and administrative offices for the School of Science administration.
 Eskenazi Fine Arts Center at Herron School of Art and Design (opened May 2013) – An expansion of a 12-year-old facility formerly known as the Herron Sculpture and Ceramics Building, the facility includes a large multi-purpose studio for the creation of public arts projects, as well as graduate studios, classrooms, galleries and a computer lab.
 Hine Hall (opened January 2013) and University Tower and Tower Dining (opened August 2013) – The former University Place Conference Center and Hotel was transformed into a multi-use facility designed to provide student housing, residential and campus dining and additional classroom space. The conversion of the facility began after nearly a yearlong study of the complex's viability by campus and Indiana University officials. Hine Hall offers 15 additional classrooms, University Tower offers residential space for 560 students and Tower Dining can seat 470 simultaneously.
 Campus Center (opened spring 2008) – The Campus Center is a  bell tower made of limestone and glass. The Campus Center houses Enrollment Services and the Offices of Financial Aid and Student Scholarship, as well as a Barnes & Noble bookstore, cultural arts gallery, game room, movie theater, bank, food court, coffee shop, meetings rooms, study spaces and more.

In 2013, IUPUI opened a School of Public Health named in honor of Richard M. Fairbanks. The Indiana University Richard M. Fairbanks School of Public Health will focus on the areas of urban health, health policy, biostatistics and epidemiology. Dr. Paul K. Halverson was named founding dean of the school.

In 2012, the Indiana Commission for Higher Education approved IU's proposal to create what is believed to be the world's first school dedicated to the study and teaching of philanthropy. The school has built on the strengths of the Center of Philanthropy at IU, a pioneer in philanthropy education, research and training. In 2013, the School was named the Indiana University Lilly School of Philanthropy in honor of the Lilly family's philanthropic leadership, as well as their profound contributions to education, research and the well-being of society. Dr. Gene Tempel was named founding dean of the school.

The IUPUI campus is home to several nationally renowned hospitals and research entities including Riley Hospital for Children at Indiana University Health, Eskenazi Health, Richard L. Roudebush VA Medical Center, Regenstrief Institute and the Indiana Clinical and Translational Sciences Institute.

More than 20 works of sculpture are located outdoors on the IUPUI campus, and the list of public art at IUPUI currently consists of 31 artworks. Additional sculptures are located on private property adjacent to IUPUI including the Indiana Avenue cultural district, Riley Hospital for Children at IU Health and the J.F. Miller Foundation.

Sustainability
Sustainability efforts began at IUPUI in the early 1990s with the development of a paper-recycling program. In 2005, the efforts became more formal through the development of an interdisciplinary campus coalition, with the formation of the IUPUI Office of Sustainability in 2011. The Office of Sustainability was formed to create a culture of campus sustainability and to make IUPUI a place where students, faculty and staff are engaged in research, teaching and learning about urban sustainability and its best practices. IUPUI has been named a Tree Campus USA for its campus forest management.

The Office of Sustainability conducts recycling and waste reduction programs; initiated energy savings projects including LEED Gold Certification achieved by the Eugene and Marilyn Glick Eye Institute and solar photovoltaic panels on the IU Kelley School of Business; implemented pollution prevention programs; created sustainable transportation on campus including the installation of bike maintenance stations and additional bike racks, supporting the development of a bike hub and establishing a partnership with Zip Cars; and developed an IUPUI Sustainability Certificate for students.

Student life
IUPUI offers student organizations, fraternities and sororities, cultural heritage month celebrations, as well as Division I athletics, Jagapalooza, and others including IUPUI's signature event, The IUPUI Regatta.

With an enrollment of more than 30,000, IUPUI's student body (undergraduate, graduate/professional) consists of 56% female and 44% male students, with 89% of students from Indiana. Demographically, the student body is 71% White, 10% African American, 4% Asian/Hawaiian/Pacific Islander, 5% Hispanic, 6% International, 3% two or more races, less than 1% American Indiana/Alaska Native and 1% unknown.

Residence life

On-campus housing can currently accommodate approximately 2,400 students and includes Ball Residence Hall, University Tower, Riverwalk Apartments, The Townhomes at IUPUI and the newest addition, North Residence Hall. 
 Ball Hall and University Tower are traditional co-ed halls that house 324 students and 650 students, respectively, in single, double and triple rooms and are dedicated to the housing and development of first-year students.
 The Townhomes at IUPUI house 60 residents in one- or two-bedroom fully furnished units averaging between 650 and 800 square feet and feature private individual residences.
 Riverwalk Apartments feature one-, two-, and four-bedroom fully furnished units and house 750 undergraduate, graduate and professional students.
North Hall, which was completed during the summer of 2016, is located on North Street near University Tower. The first new residence building on campus, it accommodates 700 undergraduates along with spaces to support student life activities, fitness programs, a computer lab, game rooms and laundry.

Ball Hall, University Tower, Riverwalk Apartments and North Hall offer Residential Based Learning Communities on designated floors, areas or buildings where students request to live near others that share an interest in a particular social cause or academic area. There are 12 different themes including International House, Living Your Freshman Experience, Women in Science, Purdue House and others.

IUPUI also offers a dining hall in the heart of campus inside of University Tower. Tower Dining is open to students, faculty, staff and the general public and seats 470 simultaneously. Breakfast, lunch and dinner are served Monday through Friday and brunch on Saturday and Sunday. Tower Dining offers six different dining options, including special dietary menus such as vegetarian and low-fat.

Student organizations
IUPUI offers more than 400 organizations in which students can get involved. Students can join an existing organization, start their own organization and/or plan, work at or attend a campus activity. Campus Center and Student Experiences helps students find matching activities outside of the classroom to their coursework, as well as to their academic and career goals. The Spot is a one-stop-shop portal that contains a comprehensive list of student organizations, events, FAQs, and grant information.

Student government 
At IUPUI, there are two recognized university student organizations representing graduate, professional, and undergraduate students.

 Undergraduate Student Government, which consists of elected executive officers and student representatives from student organizations serving as liaisons to the student body, campus partners, and university officials.
 Graduate and Professional Student Government, are elected executive officers from the General Assembly and each academic school as representatives that serve the graduate and professional student experience.

Fraternity and sorority life
IUPUI is home to 24 nationally recognized fraternities and sororities that span across four governing councils and include the National Pan-Hellenic Council, the College Panhellenic Council, Multicultural Greek Council, and the Interfraternity Council. Student membership in IUPUI's fraternities and sororities has tripled since fall 2010.

 The National Pan-Hellenic Council consists of six of the Historically Black Greek-Letter-Organizations from the National Pan-Hellenic Council: Alpha Phi Alpha fraternity, Alpha Kappa Alpha sorority, Delta Sigma Theta sorority, Phi Beta Sigma fraternity, Zeta Phi Beta sorority, and Sigma Gamma Rho sorority.
 The Panhellenic Council currently consists of six National Panhellenic Conference sororities: (Alpha Chi Omega, Alpha Sigma Alpha, Delta Zeta, Phi Mu, Sigma Kappa, and Zeta Tau Alpha)
 The Interfraternity Council consists of six North American Interfraternity Conference fraternities (Alpha Sigma Phi, Delta Sigma Phi, Phi Delta Theta, Phi Gamma Delta, Sigma Alpha Epsilon, and Tau Kappa Epsilon)
The Multicultural Greek Council consists of five organizations Delta Kappa Delta sorority, Gamma Phi Omega, La Unidad Latina/Lambda Upsilon Lambda fraternity, Sigma Lambda Upsilon/Senoritas Latinas Unidas sorority, and Sigma Psi Zeta sorority.

Service learning
Through the Center for Service & Learning and Division of Student Affairs, IUPUI gives students the opportunity to volunteer on campus and in the Indianapolis community through numerous campus-wide service and civic engagement events. During the 2014–2015 academic year, 8,750 students participated in 303,061 hours of service to 438 community partners.

Campus recreation
Campus Recreation provides activities that facilitate healthy lifestyles for a diverse population of students, faculty and staff at IUPUI. Membership provides access to swimming at the world-class IU Natatorium, fitness classes, three weight and fitness rooms, recreational open gym, access to the new IUPUI Outdoor Recreational Complex (outdoor basketball courts) and participation in the intramural program, which includes basketball, broomball, dodgeball, flag football, golf, inner tube water polo, kickball, racquetball, soccer, softball, ultimate Frisbee and volleyball.

IUPUI also has a partnership with the National Institute for Fitness and Sport and offers discounted fitness opportunities to NIFS for all full- and part-time IUPUI students. Through this partnership, the NIFS initiative fee will be waived and the monthly membership dues will be reduced for full and limited memberships.

Athletics 

The IUPUI Jaguars compete at the NCAA Division I level in the Horizon League in 16 men's (7) and women's (9) sports. The Jaguars have earned NCAA Tournament bids in volleyball, NCAA Division I Men's Soccer Championship, women's soccer, men's golf, NCAA Men's Division I Basketball Championship and women's tennis, as well as The Summit League championship in volleyball, men's tennis and women's soccer. Nine athletes have been recognized as Summit League Athletes of the Year, with seven coaches earning Coach of the Year honors. Prior to 1995, IUPUI athletic teams were known as the Metros and competed in NCAA Division II.

IUPUI is home to the Indiana University Natatorium, host of numerous national swimming championships including the 2016 U.S. Olympic Team Trials-Diving, and the IU Michael A. Carroll Track & Soccer Stadium, host of the 1987 Pan American Games, 2006 & 2007 USA Track & Field Championships and several NCAA Championships. Additionally, the stadium serves as the home field for the 
Indy Eleven soccer team of the USL Championship.

Upon the split of IUPUI in 2024, the IUPUI athletic program will transfer to the new IU Indianapolis.

Indiana University–Purdue University Columbus (IUPUC)
Closely affiliated with IUPUI, Indiana University–Purdue University Columbus was established in 1970 and is located one hour south of Indianapolis in Columbus, Indiana—an area known for its collection of modern architecture with an estimated population of more than 45,000. The growing campus serves more than 1,700 undergraduate and graduate students who live primarily in Bartholomew, Brown, Decatur, Jennings Jackson, Johnson, Ripley and Shelby counties, and offers a broad range of undergraduate degree programs in business, communication studies, elementary education, English, general studies, mechanical engineering, nursing, psychology and sociology, as well as two graduate degree programs – Master of Business Administration and Master of Arts in Mental Health Counseling. IUPUC is administered through IUPUI as a regional campus.

Notable alumni

 Norman Bridwell (Herron 1950), author and illustrator of Clifford the Big Red Dog
 Bettie Cadou (English 1957), journalist and photographer
 Julia Carson (Law 1963), former member of the U.S. House of Representatives
 Vija Celmins (Herron 1961), fine art painter and printmaker
 Dan Coats (Law 1971), 5th Director of National Intelligence, former member of the U.S. Senate, U.S. House of Representatives, and U.S. Ambassador to Germany
 George Hill, professional NBA basketball player
 Samuel D. Jackson (Law 1917), former member of U.S. Senate
 Mike Pence (Law 1986), 48th Vice President of the United States, 50th Governor of Indiana, and former member of the U.S. House of Representatives.
 Dan Quayle (Law 1974), 44th Vice President of the United States, former member of the U.S. House of Representatives and U.S. Senate
 Arthur Raymond Robinson (Law 1910), former member of the U.S. Senate
 Charles Stanley Ross (JD, 1994), Literary scholar
 Victoria Spartz (Master of Accountancy), member of the U.S. House of Representatives
 Frederick Van Nuys (Law 1900), former member of the U.S. Senate
 Samuel E Vázquez (Herron 2010), abstract expressionist painter
 David Wolf, astronaut

See also 
 Indiana University–Purdue University Fort Wayne, a defunct co-campus in Indiana's second-largest city
 Indiana University Fort Wayne, one of the successor institutions to IPFW that is administered by IUPUI.

Notes

References

External links

 
 IUPUI Athletics website

 
Universities and colleges in Indianapolis
Joint-venture schools
Educational institutions established in 1969
1969 establishments in Indiana
Universities and colleges formed by merger in the United States
Indianapolis
Indianapolis